This is a list of German television related events from 2009.

Events
9 May - Daniel Schuhmacher wins the sixth season of Deutschland sucht den Superstar.
6 July - Daniel Schöller wins the ninth season of Big Brother Germany.
20 December - 30-year-old animal trainer Yvo Antoni and his dog PrimaDonna win the third season of Das Supertalent.

Debuts

Free for air

Domestic
5 January -  (2009) (ZDF)
14 January - Countdown – Die Jagd beginnt (2009–2011) (RTL)
29 January - Die Wölfe (2009) (ZDF)
22 March -  (2009) (ZDF)
18 June - Lasko – Die Faust Gottes (2009–2010) (RTL)

International
16 September -  Lipstick Jungle (2008-2009) (ProSieben)

Cable

International
16 November - // Sandra the Fairytale Detective (2009-2010) (Disney Channel)

BFBS
 The Pinky and Perky Show (2008-2009)

Television shows

1950s
Tagesschau (1952–present)

1960s
 heute (1963–present)

1970s
 heute-journal (1978–present)
 Tagesthemen (1978–present)

1980s
Wetten, dass..? (1981-2014)
Lindenstraße (1985–present)

1990s
Gute Zeiten, schlechte Zeiten (1992–present)
Marienhof (1992–2011)
Unter uns (1994–present)
Verbotene Liebe (1995-2015)
Schloss Einstein (1998–present)
In aller Freundschaft (1998–present)
Wer wird Millionär? (1999–present)

2000s
Big Brother Germany (2000-2011, 2015–present)
Deutschland sucht den Superstar (2002–present)
Let's Dance (2006–present)
Das Supertalent (2007–present)

Ending this year

Births

Deaths

See also
2009 in Germany